Renee Maria Borges (born 25 February 1959) is an Indian evolutionary biologist and professor at the Centre for Ecological Sciences, Indian Institute of Science. Her work as a scientist has been profiled on India Today. Her research areas are behavioural and sensory ecology with special reference to plant and animal interactions such as figs and fig-wasps. Other areas of research interest include conservation biology and the history and philosophy of science.

Education
Borges studied science at St. Xavier's College, Mumbai, where she obtained her bachelor's degree (with distinction) in Zoology and Microbiology in 1979. She obtained her master's degree in animal physiology from the Institute of Science, University of Bombay in 1982. She received a PhD from the University of Miami, in Coral Gables, Florida, with a thesis entitled "Resource heterogeneity and the foraging ecology of the Malabar Giant Squirrel, Ratufa indica".

Bibliography

Borges has contributed a chapter to the book Battles Over Nature: Science and the Politics of Conservation.

Recognition
Borges' contributions have been recognized in the following ways. Some of her appointments are:

 Fellow, Indian Academy of Sciences
J. C Bose National Fellowship (2016)
Fellow, Indian National Science Academy
Chairperson of the DST-Program Advisory Committee on Animal Sciences (2016–19)
 Member, Western Ghat Ecology Expert Panel (WGEEP), Government of India, 2010–2011

References

Articles created or expanded during Women's History Month (India) - 2014
1959 births
Living people
St. Xavier's College, Mumbai alumni
Indian women biologists
Scientists from Maharashtra
Academic staff of the Indian Institute of Science
Indian Institute of Science alumni
20th-century Indian zoologists
20th-century Indian women scientists
21st-century Indian zoologists
21st-century Indian women scientists
Women scientists from Maharashtra